A social pension (or non-contributory pension) is a stream of payments from state to an individual that starts when someone retires and continues in payment until death. It is a part of a pension system of most developed countries, specifically the so-called zero or first pillar of the pension system, which is a part of state social security system. The social pension is different from other types of pension since its eligibility criteria do not require former contributions of an individual, but citizenship or residency and age or other criteria set by government.

History 
The need for a social pension comes from the times of industrial revolution, when the new economic system boosted the mobility of workers, but loosened ties between family members, whose solidarity was protecting people from personal economic deprivation. This, along with impractical voluntary thrift and insurance, resulted in many workers retiring without any source of income.

The first step in forming cash transfers to elderly can be seen in the end of 19th century. One of the first countries that introduced a social pension was Germany in 1889 by its chancellor Otto von Bismarck who wanted to connect ordinary workers with the newly created German state and granted every worker who reached age of 65 a small flat pension. At first it was funded by taxes on tobacco monopoly.

In 1890s followed Denmark (1891) and New Zealand (1898) and in the early 20th century Australia (1908), Sweden (1913) and many others. Throughout the 20th century, most of countries were deciding between two paths based on the strategy of the system – a minimum pension for the elderly or securing income maintenance either by taxed subsidized voluntary pension and compulsory income-related pension. This resulted in convergence to a dual system where both of those strategies were included.

Today, more than 100 countries grant social pension to its citizens in various forms and on average OECD countries spend 7 – 8 per cent of their GDP on the pensions for elderly and elderly care.

Reasons 
The reasons for implementing a social pension and involvement of the government are problems that are left with voluntary steps of individuals providing themselves enough funds for their retirement or with market failures, leaving inequalities in the society. As an example, we can see a shortsightedness of individuals, which causes lack of savings or additional income when they retire. This can be connected also with an information gap, when the individual is not able to assess the solvency of savings and insurance companies or productivity of investment programs. Another reason can be insurance market failures, such as moral hazard or adverse selection, which can make insurance against risks, such as longevity or disability, unavailable.

Financing 
Financing the social pension is a part of national fiscal and public finance policies and therefore it is linked to the general government budget. Generally, the social pension schemes as a part of the first pillar of pension systems use pay-as-you-go scheme (PAYG), which collects contributions in form of social security taxes every year in an amount which should be equal to the expected expenditures in the same year. This means that the system does not accumulate any reserves and if so, then only to avoid liquidity problems. The PAYG system is sometimes subject to demographic and political problems (e. g. aging of population).

Categories 
1) Universal pension (also referred to as "demogrant", "categorical pension" or "citizens pension") is a pension where the only criteria for receiving it is age and citizenship, resp. residence. Some countries are specifying these criteria further, like Netherlands which require 50 years of residency between ages of 15 and 65 for a full pension and discounts it for every missing year by 2 per cent. This type of pension might be taxable.

2) Universal minimum pension in some way overlaps the universal pension. The main difference is that the purpose of this system is to grant additional financial resources to those, who did not or could not secure themselves income high enough from the contributory second pillar of pension scheme, and therefore grants them minimum base income when they retire. The voluntary third pillar is not accounted for in this case. This system was first developed in Sweden in 1913. In addition, some countries, like Norway or Finland, have introduced s so caller "taper" which grants pensioners some additional non-contributory income, even if they already earn the minimum pension. For example, in Finland with 50 per cent taper, you can earn a pension double the amount of the minimum pension before you lose the right to the non-contributory benefit.

3) Recoverable social pension is a universal pension in terms of eligibility. The difference is that this pension is added to other taxable income and is a subject to recovery by a surcharge.

4) Social assistance pension covers all other types of social pension. It can be further divided by its means test, based on whether it is applied only on the individual or his whole household. Since the most important test considers the total income and assets possessed by an individual or the household, there can be a huge difference between those two types. In the individual means test, only the wealth of the individual matters and therefore it can better address individual poverty issues. The household means test considers the capability of other family members to take care of the retired members.

Coverage across the world 
Since 2000, the coverage of legal and effective social pension has been constantly increasing, especially in recent years. Between years 2015 and 2017 more than 90 per cent of elderly were receiving their benefits in 34 countries. The number of countries, where the effectives social pension coverage was less than 20 per cent, fell to 36. In the same period universal social pensions were established in many developing countries in Africa (Botswana, Lesotho, Namibia and Zanzibar), Asia (East Timor) and Latin America (Bolivia). In contrast to that, Azerbaijan, Albania or Greece experienced a reduction in social pension coverage by 12-16 percentage points.

Philippines 
Social Pension Program for Indigent Senior Citizens (SPISC) is a program for funding indigent senior citizens in Philippines. The government gives them monthly Five Hundred Pesos which are aimed to use for a medical equipment and services. The program is working since 2011 and being rearranged for several times, it now offers the assistance to the indigent senior citizens who are 60 years old and above.

See also
 Social insurance
 Social protection
 Social protection floor
 Social safety net
 Welfare state
 Welfare culture

References 

Egalitarianism
Social security
Pensions